Galahad is a hamlet in east-central Alberta, Canada within Flagstaff County. It is located just a few miles north of the Battle River valley on a former Canadian National rail line. The hamlet was originally incorporated as a village on May 5, 1918. It dissolved to become a hamlet under the jurisdiction of Flagstaff County on January 1, 2016.

Demographics 

As a designated place in the 2016 Census of Population conducted by Statistics Canada, Galahad had a population of 111 living in 44 of its 46 total private dwellings, a  change from its 2011 population of 119.

Economy 
The economic base of the Galahad area is agriculture (wheat, barley, canola as well as ranching), oil and gas production, coal mining and power generation.

Arts and culture 
The community was named after Galahad, of Arthurian legend. Of interest, the roads in Galahad have been given names pertaining to Arthurian legend. The hamlet has roads named Merlin Street, Sir Lancelot Street (which perhaps not surprisingly intersects with Guinevere Avenue) and King Arthur Street. Other road names include "Lady Helen" and "Lady Vivian," which are figures not clearly connected with Camelot.

Transportation 
Nearby transportation routes include Highway 36 and Highway 53.

See also 
List of communities in Alberta
List of former urban municipalities in Alberta
List of hamlets in Alberta

References

External links 

1918 establishments in Alberta
2016 disestablishments in Alberta
Designated places in Alberta
Flagstaff County
Former villages in Alberta
Hamlets in Alberta
Populated places disestablished in 2016